Allocrioceras is an ammonoid cephalopod from the Turonian to Santonian stages of the Late Cretaceous, included in the turrilitoid family Anisoceratidae. Its shell is strongly ribbed and is in the form of a widely open spiral.

Classification 
After its 1907 discovery, the species A. hazzardi was erroneously classified as Crioceras latus by Udden. A later 1928 revision by Adkins removed it from the species C. latus while keeping it as a member of the genus Crioceras. In 1963, Young gave the species its final classification in a new genus, Allocrioceras, originally defined by Spath in 1926.

Biology 
Allocrioceras was small compared to some Ammonites. Its shell diameter was only a bit larger than an U.S. quarter. Unlike most Ammonites its shell was partially uncoiled. Ammonites like this, with shell configurations differing from the typical tightly coiled spiral, are called heteromorphs. It lived approximately 88 million years before present during the Turonian stage Cretaceous Period in what is now Texas. Its fossils can be found in the limestones of Brewster and Terrel counties.

Its stomach contents and some soft parts have been preserved in a fossil specimen of the species A. cf. annulatum found in the Sannine Formation of Lebanon, which show it preyed on comatulid crinoids and was a pelagic, aperture-upwards drifter.

Distribution 
Fossils of Allocrioceras have been found in Colombia (Loma Gorda Formation, Aipe, Huila), France, Germany, Lebanon, South Africa, Ukraine, the United Kingdom, and the United States (Arizona, Montana, New Mexico, Texas, Utah).

References

Bibliography 
 

Ammonitida genera
Heteromorphic ammonites
Turonian genus first appearances
Santonian genus extinctions
Ammonites of Africa
Cretaceous Africa
Late Cretaceous ammonites of Europe
Late Cretaceous ammonites of North America
Cretaceous United States
Ammonites of South America
Cretaceous Colombia
Fossil taxa described in 1926
Turrilitoidea